New Edlington is an area of the town of Edlington, Metropolitan Borough of Doncaster, South Yorkshire, England, lying close to Warmsworth and the A630 road.

Churches and places of worship

Warmsworth and New Edlington Church lies on the border of Edlington and Warmsworth. It is located on Edlington Lane near Warmsworth Halt, an area of Warmsworth village.

St John the Baptist's Church is situated on St John's Lane in the western part of New Edlington.

History

Mining

There is a pit-plain round the back of New Edlingon and Warmsworth, near Martinwells Lake. Both New and Old Edlington are pit-villages.

External links
 Martinwells Lake
 Conisbrough, a close neighbour

Villages in South Yorkshire